Associazione Calcio Monteriggioni Associazione Sportiva Dilettantistica was an Italian association football club, based in Monteriggioni, Tuscany.

History 
The club was founded in 1969 as A.S. Badesse.

Monteriggioni in the season 2010–11, from Serie D group E was relegated to Eccellenza Tuscany.

The transfer to Colle Val d'Elsa 
In summer 2011 the side, after the merger with Colle Giovane, transferred the seat and its sports title of Eccellenza to the city of Colle Val d'Elsa, becoming A.S.D. Olimpia Colligiana.

The football in the city is reborn, with a new club called A.C. Badesse, that is restarted from the Terza Categoria Siena.

League and cup history

Colors and badge 
The team's colors were white and dark blue.

References 

Football clubs in Tuscany
Association football clubs established in 1969
Association football clubs disestablished in 2011
1969 establishments in Italy
2011 disestablishments in Italy